The 1905–06 İstanbul Football League season was the second season of the league. Cadi-Keuy FC won the league for the first time.

Season

References
 1905-1906 İstanbul Futbol Ligi. Türk Futbol Tarihi vol.1. page(29). (June 1992) Türkiye Futbol Federasyonu Yayınları.

Istanbul Football League seasons
Istanbul
Istanbul Football League
Istanbul Football League